Vegard Røed (born 1 December 1975) is a retired Norwegian football midfielder.

He started his youth career in Lier IL and represented Norway as a youth international. He made his debut for Strømsgodset IF in 1993 and played in the 1994 and 1996 Eliteserien. Ahead of the 1997 season he joined lowly SBK Drafn.

He is a younger brother of Thomas Røed.

References

1975 births
Living people
People from Lier, Norway
Norwegian footballers
Strømsgodset Toppfotball players
Eliteserien players
Norwegian First Division players
Association football midfielders
Norway youth international footballers
Sportspeople from Viken (county)